Malini Olivo (born 1961) is a Professor of Biophotonics at the National University of Ireland, Galway and Royal College of Surgeons in Ireland. In 2015, she was elected by the Optical Society of America for "pioneering contribution in Clinical Photodiagnostics in the area of clinical spectroscopy and imaging in early cancer detection and photo-therapeutics of cancer".

Education 
She obtained a Bachelor of Science with Education degree in Physics and Mathematics in 1985 and a Doctorate degree in Biomedical Physics from the University of Malaya and University College London in 1990, working on photodynamic therapy of cancer. She then engaged in post-doctoral research in medical biophotonics in the laboratory of Professor Brian Wilson, University of Toronto and Princess Margaret Cancer Centre, in Toronto, Canada.

Career 
She was appointed as Senior Scientist and Principal Investigator at National Cancer Centre Singapore between 1995 and 2009. In 2007, she was also appointed as Head of Bio-optical Imaging at the Singapore Bioimaging Consortium (SBIC) and also Adjunct Professor at Department of Pharmacy, National University of Singapore. In 2009, she was appointed as Stokes Professor of Biophotonics at the National University of Ireland, Galway and Adjunct Professor of Biophotonics in Royal College of Surgeons in Ireland.

Awards and recognition 
She is recognised for her research in photomedicine by the International Biophotonics Community and regarded as a pioneer in the area of clinical applications of photomedicine in optical diagnostics and therapeutics both in Singapore and Ireland. 

She received the SingHealth research excellence award for her contribution to scientific research excellence in the area of clinical biophotonics for diagnostics and therapeutics of cancer. She has won numerous awards in recognition of her contribution to biophotonics in Singapore, Ireland and the United States, including election as a fellow of the American Institute for Medical and Biological Engineering. Her research interest is in nano-biophotonics and its applications in translational medicine. She has published over 300 scientific papers. Her international standing in her field allows her to serve in numerous international scientific advisory boards in the area of Photonics in Medicine.

Research 

 Clinical Photodiagnostics in the area of clinical spectroscopy and imaging and phototherapeutics of cancer 
 Biophotonics in Medicine and Biology 
 NanoBiophotonics 
 Nanomedicine

References

1961 births
Living people
Academics of the University of Galway
Alumni of University College London
Irish medical researchers
Royal College of Surgeons in Ireland
University of Malaya alumni
Women in optics
Fellows of Optica (society)